In potential theory, a mathematical discipline, balayage (from French: balayage "scanning, sweeping") is a method devised by Henri Poincaré for reconstructing a harmonic function in a domain from its values on the boundary of the domain.

In modern terms, the balayage operator maps a measure μ on a closed domain D to a measure ν on the boundary ∂ D, so that the Newtonian potentials of μ and ν coincide outside . The procedure is called balayage since the mass is "swept out" from D onto the boundary.

For x in D, the balayage of δx yields the harmonic measure νx corresponding to x. Then the value of a harmonic function f at x is equal to

References 

Potential theory